Ultimate Kronos Group is an American multinational technology company.

UKG may also stand for:

 UK garage, a British genre of electronic dance music
 Umagang Kay Ganda, a defunct Filipino morning news show
 UK Government, Government of the United Kingdom